Khan Muttaqi Nadeem (Urdu خان مطقی  ندیم)
(8 March 1940 – July 2006) was born in Kanpur, Uttar Pradesh, India, and was an advocate lawyer, poet and author.

Education and work 
Khan Muttaqi Nadeem had an LLB and LLM degree from islamia law college, Karachi, Pakistan. He received his BA from University of Karachi.

He served the Government of Sindh as Assistant Advocate General and then Additional Advocate General Sindh for many years.

He  served as Benazir Bhutto's lawyer in Sindh. Nadeem was appointed as Assistant Advocate General, Sindh in 1989. He was very influential among Ullema and politicians and had presented the Shia community in important cases including the Tribunal of 1984. Nadeem was the Bani-e-Julos of 9th and 10th muharam which rose from Mehfil-e-Haidri karachi.

Personal life 
Nadeem was married to Syeda Waqar Jehan and they have three sons and three daughters. He died in July 2006 and is buried in the Wadi-e-Hussain graveyard in Karachi.

References

People from Kanpur
Pakistani lawyers
Pakistani scholars
Pakistani poets
Muhajir people
2006 deaths